Fabien Boisvert (June 21, 1839 – November 12, 1897) was a politician, land surveyor and farmer. He was elected to the House of Commons of Canada in an 1888 by-election as an independent Conservative-affiliated Member to represent the riding of Nicolet after the death of Athanase Gaudet. He was re-elected in 1896.

He was the son of Dominique Boisvert and was educated at the Séminaire de Nicolet. In 1867, he married Marie Philomene Hamel. Boisvert also served as president of the local school board. He died in office at the age of 58.

References 
 The Canadian parliamentary companion, 1897, AJ Gemmill

External links
 

1839 births
1897 deaths
Independent MPs in the Canadian House of Commons
Members of the House of Commons of Canada from Quebec